Campanile is an Italian surname. Notable people with the surname include:

 Achille Campanile (1899–1977), Italian writer, playwright, journalist and television critic
 Anthony Campanile (born 1982), American football coach
 Giovanni Agostino Campanile (died 1594), Roman Catholic prelate, Bishop of Minori (1567-1594)
 Pasquale Festa Campanile (1927–1986), Italian screenwriter, film director and novelist
 Raffaele Festa Campanile (born 1961), Italian television author, screenwriter, film director and music producer
 Viviana Campanile Zagorianakou (born 1990), Greek beauty pageant contestant

Italian-language surnames